Flammulina is a genus of very small air-breathing land snails, terrestrial pulmonate gastropod mollusks in the subfamily Flammulininae of the family  Charopidae.

Species
Species within the genus Flammulina include:
 Flammulina albozonata N. Gardner, 1969
 Flammulina chiron (Gray, 1850)
 Flammulina cornea (Hutton, 1882)
 Flammulina crebriflammea (Reeve, 1852)
 Flammulina feredayi (Suter, 1891)
 Flammulina festiva Hylton Scott, 1970
 Flammulina jacquenetta (Hutton, 1883)
 Flammulina lateaperta Dell, 1955
 Flammulina olivacea (Suter, 1892)
 Flammulina perdita (Hutton, 1883)
 Flammulina tepakiensis N. Gardner, 1977
 Flammulina zebra (Le Guillou, 1842)

References

 Bank, R. A. (2017). Classification of the Recent terrestrial Gastropoda of the World. Last update: July 16th, 2017

Charopidae